Diario AS is a Spanish daily sports newspaper that concentrates particularly on football.

Profile
Diario AS is part of PRISA which also owns El País and Cinco Días. The paper particularly covers news of the Community of Madrid football teams: Real Madrid, Atlético Madrid, Getafe CF, CD Leganés,  and Rayo Vallecano. It competes directly with MARCA.

In addition to Madrid, the newspaper also has satellite bureaus in Barcelona, Bilbao, A Coruña, Seville, Valencia and Zaragoza.

In May 2012 the newspaper launched an English language sub-site offering original journalism and articles translated from the original Spanish by native English-language speakers.

The circulation of Diario AS was 181,172 copies in 2001 and 176,892 copies in 2002. It rose to 214,654 copies in 2006.

References

External links

 Official web site 
 Official English Website 

1967 establishments in Spain
Association football websites
Daily newspapers published in Spain
Newspapers established in 1967
Newspapers published in Madrid
Spanish-language newspapers
Spanish-language websites
As
Sports mass media in Spain
Spanish news websites